Wallon-Cappel is a commune in the Nord department in northern France.

Heraldry

Population

See also
Communes of the Nord department

References

External links
 German launching base for their V1 pilotless aircraft south-east of Wallon-Cappel

Walloncappel
French Flanders